Alexandra Hasler (born 1 June 1997) is a Swiss snowboarder. She competed in the 2018 Winter Olympics.

References

1997 births
Living people
Snowboarders at the 2018 Winter Olympics
Swiss female snowboarders
Olympic snowboarders of Switzerland